Barbicide is a disinfectant solution used by barbers and cosmetologists for disinfecting grooming tools such as combs and hair-cutting shears. Manufactured by King Research, it was invented in 1947 by Maurice King and marketed heavily around the United States by his brother James.

Barbicide is a United States Environmental Protection Agency–approved combination germicide, pseudomonacide, fungicide, and a viricide effective against HIV-1, hepatitis B, and hepatitis C. Its active ingredient is alkyl dimethyl benzyl ammonium chloride (5.12% by volume); sodium nitrite and blue dye are also present.

Barbicide is sold as a concentrate diluted for use in a ratio of 2 oz. of Barbicide concentrate mixed into 32 oz. of water, with each stylist having a container for treating their own tools.

Company technicians make (unverified) claims it is the only such disinfectant to hold its power and colour over time, maintaining competitors' products eventually turn green or brown.

At one time, several US states legally required barber shops to use Barbicide and according to the maker, two states continued to in 1997. A jar of Barbicide sits on display in the Smithsonian Institution's National Museum of American History.

References

External links
King Research
Barbicide Material Safety Data Sheet
Official Barbicide Europe Website

Disinfectants
Hairdressing
Products introduced in 1947